

D' 

 Jean-Claude D'Amours b. 1972 first elected in 2004 as Liberal member for Madawaska—Restigouche, New Brunswick.
 Chris d'Entremont b. 1969 first elected in 2019 as Conservative member for West Nova, Nova Scotia.

Da
 Julie Dabrusin b. 1971 first elected in 2015 as Liberal member for Toronto—Danforth, Ontario.
 John Dahmer b. 1938 first elected in 1988 as Progressive Conservative member for Beaver River, Alberta.
 Madeleine Dalphond-Guiral b. 1938 first elected in 1993 as Bloc Québécois member for Laval Centre, Quebec.
 Marc Dalton b. 1960 first elected in 2019 as Conservative member for Maple Ridge-Mission, British Columbia.
 Malachy Bowes Daly b. 1836 first elected in 1878 as Liberal-Conservative member for Halifax, Nova Scotia.
 Thomas Mayne Daly b. 1827 first elected in 1872 as Liberal-Conservative member for Perth North, Ontario.
 Thomas Mayne Daly b. 1852 first elected in 1887 as Liberal-Conservative member for Selkirk, Manitoba.
 Pam Damoff b. 1971 first elected in 2015 as Liberal member for Oakville North—Burlington, Ontario.
 Arthur Byron Damude b. 1889 first elected in 1935 as Liberal member for Welland, Ontario.
 Raquel Dancho b. 1990 first elected in 2019 as Conservative member for Kildonan—St. Paul, Manitoba. 
 Harold Warren Danforth b. 1916 first elected in 1958 as Progressive Conservative member for Kent, Ontario.
 Joe Daniel b. 1954 first elected in 2011 as Conservative member for Don Valley East, Ontario. 
 John Waterhouse Daniel b. 1845 first elected in 1904 as Conservative member for City of St. John, New Brunswick.
 Kenneth Daniel b. 1892 first elected in 1945 as Progressive Conservative member for Oxford, Ontario.
 Marcel Danis b. 1943 first elected in 1984 as Progressive Conservative member for Verchères, Quebec.
 Barnett Jerome Danson b. 1921 first elected in 1968 as Liberal member for York North, Ontario.
 Vincent Martin Dantzer b. 1923 first elected in 1980 as Progressive Conservative member for Okanagan North, British Columbia.
 Jean-Baptiste Daoust b. 1817 first elected in 1867 as Conservative member for Two Mountains, Quebec.
 Francis Nicholson Darke b. 1863 first elected in 1925 as Liberal member for Regina, Saskatchewan.
 Stan Darling b. 1911 first elected in 1972 as Progressive Conservative member for Parry Sound—Muskoka, Ontario.
 Arnold Darroch b. 1898 first elected in 1949 as Liberal member for Wellington North, Ontario.
 David Bruce Daubney b. 1947 first elected in 1984 as Progressive Conservative member for Ottawa West, Ontario.
 Robert Daudlin b. 1940 first elected in 1974 as Liberal member for Kent—Essex, Ontario.
 Michel Daviault b. 1952 first elected in 1993 as Bloc Québécois member for Ahuntsic, Quebec.
 Avard Longley Davidson b. 1877 first elected in 1911 as Conservative member for Annapolis, Nova Scotia.
 James Ironside Davidson b. 1818 first elected in 1891 as Liberal member for Ontario South, Ontario.
 Patricia Davidson b. 1946 first elected in 2006 as Conservative member for Sarnia—Lambton, Ontario. 
 Robert Davison b. 1875 first elected in 1935 as Liberal member for Stanstead, Quebec.
Scot Davidson first elected in 2019 as Conservative member for York—Simcoe, Ontario. 
 Claudius Charles Davies b. 1879 first elected in 1921 as Progressive member for North Battleford, Saskatchewan.
 Daniel Davies b. 1825 first elected in 1873 as Conservative member for King's County, Prince Edward Island.
 Don Davies b. 1963 first elected in 2008 as New Democratic member for Vancouver Kingsway, British Columbia.
 Libby Davies b. 1953 first elected in 1997 as New Democratic Party member for Vancouver East, British Columbia.
 Louis Henry Davies b. 1845 first elected in 1882 as Liberal member for Queen's County, Prince Edward Island.
 Percy Griffith Davies b. 1902 first elected in 1932 as Conservative member for Athabaska, Alberta.
 Nicholas Flood Davin b. 1843 first elected in 1887 as Liberal-Conservative member for Assiniboia West, Northwest Territories.
 Donald Watson Davis b. 1849 first elected in 1887 as Conservative member for Provisional District of Alberta, Northwest Territories.
 Fred Davis b. 1868 first elected in 1925 as Conservative member for Calgary East, Alberta.
 Fred Langdon Davis b. 1868 first elected in 1917 as Unionist member for Neepawa, Manitoba.
 John Davis b. 1916 first elected in 1962 as Liberal member for Coast-Capilano, British Columbia.
 Thomas Osborne Davis b. 1856 first elected in 1896 as Liberal member for Provisional District of Saskatchewan, Northwest Territories.
 Dennis Dawson b. 1949 first elected in 1977 as Liberal member for Louis-Hébert, Quebec.
 George Walker Wesley Dawson b. 1858 first elected in 1891 as Liberal member for Addington, Ontario.
 John A. Dawson first elected in 1874 as Liberal member for Pictou, Nova Scotia.
 Simon James Dawson b. 1820 first elected in 1878 as Conservative member for Algoma, Ontario.
 Anne-Marie Day b. 1954 first elected in 2011 as New Democratic Party member for Charlesbourg—Haute-Saint-Charles, Quebec.
 Stockwell Day b. 1950 first elected in 2000 as Canadian Alliance member for Okanagan—Coquihalla, British Columbia.

De 

 Pierre De Bané b. 1938   first elected in 1968 as Liberal member for Matane, Quebec.
 Roland De Corneille b. 1927   first elected in 1979 as Liberal member for Eglinton—Lawrence, Ontario.
 Amor De Cosmos b. 1825 first elected in 1871 as Liberal member for Victoria, British Columbia.
 Robert René De Cotret b. 1944   first elected in 1978 as Progressive Conservative member for Ottawa Centre, Ontario.
 Simon Leendert De Jong b. 1942   first elected in 1979 as New Democratic Party member for Regina East, Saskatchewan.
 Pierre de Savoye b. 1942   first elected in 1993 as Bloc Québécois member for Portneuf, Quebec.
 Joseph Esdras Alfred de St-Georges b. 1849 first elected in 1872 as Liberal member for Portneuf, Quebec.
 Jeremiah Smith Boies De Veber b. 1830 first elected in 1873 as Liberal member for City of St. John, New Brunswick.
 Grant Deachman b. 1913   first elected in 1963 as Liberal member for Vancouver Quadra, British Columbia.
 Robert John Deachman b. 1878   first elected in 1935 as Liberal member for Huron North, Ontario.
 Walter Deakon b. 1924   first elected in 1968 as Liberal member for High Park, Ontario.
 Ian Deans b. 1937   first elected in 1980 as New Democratic Party member for Hamilton Mountain, Ontario.
 Claude DeBellefeuille b. 1963 first elected in 2006 as Bloc Québécois member for Beauharnois—Salaberry, Quebec.
 Maud Debien b. 1938   first elected in 1993 as Bloc Québécois member for Laval East, Quebec.
 Charles Deblois b. 1939   first elected in 1988 as Progressive Conservative member for Montmorency—Orléans, Quebec.
 Alphonse Arthur Miville Déchêne b. 1848 first elected in 1896 as Liberal member for L'Islet, Quebec.
 Joseph Bruno Aimé Miville Déchêne b. 1882   first elected in 1917 as Laurier Liberal member for Montmagny, Quebec.
 Joseph Miville Dechene b. 1879   first elected in 1940 as Liberal member for Athabaska, Alberta.
 Bob Dechert b. 1958 first elected in 2008 as Conservative member for Mississauga—Erindale, Ontario.
 John Decore b. 1909   first elected in 1949 as Liberal member for Vegreville, Alberta.
 Matt DeCourcey b. 1983 first elected in 2015 as Liberal member for Fredericton, New Brunswick.
 Dean Del Mastro b. 1970 first elected in 2006 as Conservative member for Peterborough, Ontario. 
 Arthur Delisle b. 1859 first elected in 1891 as Liberal member for Portneuf, Quebec.
 Michel-Siméon Delisle b. 1856 first elected in 1900 as Liberal member for Portneuf, Quebec.
 Vincent Della Noce b. 1943   first elected in 1984 as Progressive Conservative member for Duvernay, Quebec.
 Louis Delorme b. 1824 first elected in 1870 as Liberal member for St. Hyacinthe, Quebec.
 Pierre Delorme b. 1831 first elected in 1871 as Conservative member for Provencher, Manitoba.
 Gérard Deltell b. 1964 first elected in 2015 as Conservative member for Louis-Saint-Laurent, Quebec.
 Léopold Demers b. 1912   first elected in 1948 as Liberal member for Laval—Two Mountains, Quebec.
 Louis Julien Demers b. 1848 first elected in 1899 as Liberal member for Lévis, Quebec.
 Louis Philippe Demers b. 1863 first elected in 1900 as Liberal member for St. Johns—Iberville, Quebec.
 Marie Joseph Demers b. 1871 first elected in 1906 as Liberal member for St. Johns—Iberville, Quebec.
 Nicole Demers b. 1950   first elected in 2004 as Bloc Québécois member for Laval, Quebec.
 Yves Demers b. 1938   first elected in 1972 as Liberal member for Duvernay, Quebec.
 Pierre Deniger b. 1947   first elected in 1979 as Liberal member for Laprairie, Quebec.
 Azellus Denis b. 1907   first elected in 1935 as Liberal member for St. Denis, Quebec.
 Jean-Joseph Denis b. 1876   first elected in 1917 as Laurier Liberal member for Joliette, Quebec.
 Joseph-Arthur Denis b. 1881   first elected in 1921 as Liberal member for St. Denis, Quebec.
 Louis Deniset b. 1919   first elected in 1957 as Liberal member for St. Boniface, Manitoba.
 Frederick Charles Denison b. 1846 first elected in 1887 as Conservative member for West Toronto, Ontario.
 Daniel Derbyshire b. 1846 first elected in 1904 as Liberal member for Brockville, Ontario.
 Alexis Lesieur Desaulniers b. 1837 first elected in 1884 as Conservative member for Maskinongé, Quebec.
 Arthur Lesieur Desaulniers b. 1873 first elected in 1917 as Laurier Liberal member for Champlain, Quebec.
 François Sévère Lesieur Desaulniers b. 1850 first elected in 1887 as Conservative member for Saint Maurice, Quebec.
 Louis Léon Lesieur Desaulniers b. 1823 first elected in 1867 as Conservative member for Saint Maurice, Quebec.
 Caroline Desbiens first elected in 2019 as Bloc Québécois member for Beauport—Côte-de-Beaupré—Île d'Orléans—Charlevoix, Quebec.
 Joseph Adélard Descarries b. 1853 first elected in 1915 as Conservative member for Jacques Cartier, Quebec.
 Marcel Deschambault b. 1916   first elected in 1958 as Progressive Conservative member for Terrebonne, Quebec.
 Johanne Deschamps b. 1959   first elected in 2004 as Bloc Québécois member for Laurentides—Labelle, Quebec.
 Jean-Paul Deschatelets b. 1912   first elected in 1953 as Liberal member for Maisonneuve—Rosemont, Quebec.
 Joseph-Félix Descoteaux b. 1863 first elected in 1923 as Liberal member for Nicolet, Quebec.
 Bernard Deshaies b. 1953   first elected in 1993 as Bloc Québécois member for Abitibi, Quebec.
 Luc Desilets first elected in 2019 as Bloc Québécois member for Rivière-des-Mille-Îles, Quebec.
 Alphonse Desjardins b. 1841 first elected in 1874 as Conservative member for Hochelaga, Quebec.
 Gabriel Desjardins b. 1949   first elected in 1984 as Progressive Conservative member for Témiscamingue, Quebec.
 Louis-Georges Desjardins b. 1849 first elected in 1890 as Conservative member for Montmorency, Quebec.
 Samuel Desjardins b. 1852 first elected in 1903 as Liberal member for Terrebonne, Quebec.
 Bev Desjarlais b. 1955   first elected in 1997 as New Democratic Party member for Churchill, Manitoba.
 Blake Desjarlais first elected in 2021 as New Democratic Party member for Edmonton Griesbach, Alberta. 
 Hermas Deslauriers b. 1879   first elected in 1917 as Laurier Liberal member for St. Mary, Quebec.
 Joseph-Léon Deslières b. 1893   first elected in 1952 as Liberal member for Brome—Missisquoi, Quebec.
 Louis R. Desmarais b. 1923   first elected in 1979 as Liberal member for Dollard, Quebec.
 Odilon Desmarais b. 1854 first elected in 1896 as Liberal member for St. James, Quebec.
 Clayton Earl Desmond b. 1894   first elected in 1940 as National Government member for Kent, Ontario.
 Luc Desnoyers b. 1950 first elected in 2008 as Bloc Québécois member for Rivière-des-Mille-Îles, Quebec. 
 Eugène Desrochers b. 1885   first elected in 1921 as Liberal member for Maskinongé, Quebec.
 Jules Desrochers b. 1874 first elected in 1930 as Liberal member for Portneuf, Quebec.
 Odina Desrochers b. 1951   first elected in 1997 as Bloc Québécois member for Lotbinière, Quebec.
 Édouard Desrosiers b. 1934   first elected in 1984 as Progressive Conservative member for Hochelaga—Maisonneuve, Quebec.
 Alexis Dessaint b. 1847 first elected in 1887 as Liberal member for Kamouraska, Quebec.
 Paul Devillers b. 1946   first elected in 1993 as Liberal member for Simcoe North, Ontario.
 Bernard Devlin b. 1824 first elected in 1875 as Liberal member for Montreal Centre, Quebec.
 Charles Ramsay Devlin b. 1858 first elected in 1891 as Liberal member for County of Ottawa, Quebec.
 Emmanuel Berchmans Devlin b. 1872 first elected in 1905 as Liberal member for Wright, Quebec.
 Barry Devolin b. 1963   first elected in 2004 as Conservative member for Haliburton—Kawartha Lakes—Brock, Ontario.
 Austin Edwin Dewar b. 1912   first elected in 1949 as Liberal member for Qu'Appelle, Saskatchewan.
 Marion Dewar b. 1928   first elected in 1987 as New Democratic Party member for Hamilton Mountain, Ontario.
 Paul Dewar b. 1963 first elected in 2006 as New Democratic Party member for Ottawa Centre, Ontario. 
 Edgar Dewdney b. 1835 first elected in 1872 as Conservative member for Yale, British Columbia.
 Herb Dhaliwal b. 1952   first elected in 1993 as Liberal member for Vancouver South, British Columbia.
 Ruby Dhalla b. 1974 first elected in 2004 as Liberal member for Brampton—Springdale, Ontario.

Dh
Sukh Dhaliwal b. 1960 first elected in 2006 as Liberal member for Newton—North Delta, British Columbia.
Anju Dhillon b. 1979 first elected in 2015 as Liberal member for Dorval—Lachine—LaSalle, Quebec.

Di 
 Nicola Di Iorio b. 1958 first elected in 2015 as Liberal member for Saint-Léonard—Saint-Michel, Quebec.
 Lena Diab b. 1965 first elected in 2021 as Liberal member for Halifax West, Nova Scotia.
 Paul Wyatt Dick b. 1940   first elected in 1972 as Progressive Conservative member for Lanark—Renfrew—Carleton, Ontario.
 Arthur Rupert Dickey b. 1854 first elected in 1888 as Conservative member for Cumberland, Nova Scotia.
 John Horace Dickey b. 1914   first elected in 1947 as Liberal member for Halifax, Nova Scotia.
 Charles Herbert Dickie b. 1859 first elected in 1921 as Conservative member for Nanaimo, British Columbia.
 George Lemuel Dickinson b. 1848 first elected in 1888 as Conservative member for Carleton, Ontario.
 Moss Kent Dickinson b. 1822 first elected in 1882 as Conservative member for Russell, Ontario.
 John Diefenbaker b. 1895   first elected in 1940 as Conservative member for Lake Centre, Saskatchewan.
 Wilbert David Dimock b. 1846 first elected in 1896 as Conservative member for Colchester, Nova Scotia.
 David Charles Dingwall b. 1952   first elected in 1980 as Liberal member for Cape Breton—East Richmond, Nova Scotia.
 Walter Gilbert Dinsdale b. 1916   first elected in 1951 as Progressive Conservative member for Brandon, Manitoba.
 Joseph-Alfred Dion b. 1897   first elected in 1945 as Independent Liberal member for Lake St-John—Roberval, Quebec.
 Rolland Dion b. 1938   first elected in 1979 as Liberal member for Portneuf, Quebec.
 Stéphane Dion b. 1955   first elected in 1996 as Liberal member for Saint-Laurent—Cartierville, Quebec.
 Charles-Eugène Dionne b. 1908   first elected in 1962 as Social Credit member for Kamouraska, Quebec.
 Georges-Léonidas Dionne b. 1876   first elected in 1925 as Liberal member for Matane, Quebec.
 Ludger Dionne b. 1888   first elected in 1945 as Liberal member for Beauce, Quebec.
 Marcel Dionne b. 1931   first elected in 1979 as Liberal member for Chicoutimi, Quebec.
 Maurice Dionne b. 1936   first elected in 1974 as Liberal member for Northumberland—Miramichi, New Brunswick.
 Pierre Dionne Labelle b. 1955 first elected in 2011 as New Democratic Party member for Rivière-du-Nord, Quebec.
 Kerry Diotte b. 1956 first elected in 2015 as Conservative member for Edmonton Griesbach, Alberta. 
 Nunzio Discepola b. 1949   first elected in 1993 as Liberal member for Vaudreuil, Quebec.

Do 

 Dorothy Dobbie b. 1945   first elected in 1988 as Progressive Conservative member for Winnipeg South, Manitoba.
 Thomas William Dobbie b. 1829 first elected in 1867 as Conservative member for Elgin East, Ontario.
 Richard Reid Dobell b. 1837 first elected in 1896 as Liberal member for Quebec West, Quebec.
 Michelle Dockrill b. 1959   first elected in 1997 as New Democratic Party member for Bras d'Or, Nova Scotia.
 Murray Dodd b. 1843 first elected in 1882 as Conservative member for Cape Breton, Nova Scotia.
 Anson Dodge b. 1834 first elected in 1872 as Conservative member for York North, Ontario.
 Charles Joseph Doherty b. 1855 first elected in 1908 as Conservative member for St. Anne, Quebec.
 Todd Doherty first elected in 2015 as Conservative member for Cariboo—Prince George, British Columbia. 
 William Henry Domm b. 1930   first elected in 1979 as Progressive Conservative member for Peterborough, Ontario.
 James Domville b. 1842 first elected in 1872 as Conservative member for King's, New Brunswick.
 Dugald Donaghy b. 1873 first elected in 1925 as Liberal member for Vancouver North, British Columbia.
 William Donahue b. 1834 first elected in 1874 as Liberal member for Missisquoi, Quebec.
 Samuel James Donaldson b. 1856 first elected in 1915 as Conservative member for Prince Albert, Saskatchewan.
 Han Dong b. 1977 first elected in 2019 as Liberal member for Don Valley North, Ontario.
 Fin Donnelly b. 1966 first elected in 2009 as New Democratic Party member for New Westminster—Coquitlam, British Columbia. 
 James J. Donnelly b. 1866 first elected in 1904 as Conservative member for Bruce East, Ontario.
 Thomas F. Donnelly b. 1874 first elected in 1925 as Liberal member for Willow Bunch, Saskatchewan.
 Rosane Doré Lefebvre b. 1984 first elected in 2011 as New Democratic Party member for Alfred-Pellan, Quebec. 
 Murray Dorin b. 1953   first elected in 1984 as Progressive Conservative member for Edmonton West, Alberta.
 Antoine-Aimé Dorion b. 1818 first elected in 1867 as Liberal member for Hochelaga, Quebec.
 Charles Napoléon Dorion b. 1887   first elected in 1930 as Conservative member for Québec—Montmorency, Quebec.
 Frédéric Dorion b. 1898   first elected in 1942 as Independent member for Charlevoix—Saguenay, Quebec.
Jean Dorion b. 1942 first elected in 2008 as Bloc Québécois member for Longueuil—Pierre-Boucher, Quebec.
 Noël Dorion b. 1904   first elected in 1958 as Progressive Conservative member for Bellechasse, Quebec.
 Pierre Nérée Dorion b. 1816 first elected in 1872 as Liberal member for Drummond—Arthabaska, Quebec.
 George Dormer b. 1838 first elected in 1872 as Conservative member for Victoria South, Ontario.
 Ujjal Dosanjh b. 1947   first elected in 2004 as Liberal member for Vancouver South, British Columbia.
 Alexandre-Joseph Doucet b. 1880   first elected in 1923 as Conservative member for Kent, New Brunswick.
 George Doucett b. 1897   first elected in 1957 as Progressive Conservative member for Lanark, Ontario.
 Albert B. Douglas b. 1912   first elected in 1968 as Liberal member for Assiniboia, Saskatchewan.
 Crawford Douglas b. 1931   first elected in 1974 as Liberal member for Bruce, Ontario.
 James Lester Douglas b. 1881   first elected in 1940 as Liberal member for Queen's, Prince Edward Island.
 James McCrie Douglas b. 1867 first elected in 1909 as Liberal member for Strathcona, Alberta.
 James Moffat Douglas b. 1839 first elected in 1896 as Liberal member for Assiniboia East, Northwest Territories.
 John Carey Douglas b. 1874 first elected in 1917 as Unionist member for Cape Breton South and Richmond, Nova Scotia.
 Thomas Clement Douglas b. 1904   first elected in 1935 as CCF member for Weyburn, Saskatchewan.
 Robert Doull b. 1828 first elected in 1872 as Liberal-Conservative member for Pictou, Nova Scotia.
 Terry Dowdall first elected in 2019 as Conservative member for Simcoe—Grey, Ontario. 
 Cliff Downey b. 1928 first elected in 1968 as Progressive Conservative member for Battle River, Alberta.
 Norman E. Doyle b. 1945   first elected in 1997 as Progressive Conservative member for St. John's East, Newfoundland and Labrador.
 Cyrille Doyon b. 1843 first elected in 1887 as Independent Liberal member for Laprairie, Quebec.

Dr 

 Henry Lumley Drayton b. 1869 first elected in 1919 as Conservative member for Kingston, Ontario.
 Earl Dreeshen b. 1953 first elected in 2008 as Conservative member for Red Deer, Alberta. 
 George Alexander Drew b. 1826 first elected in 1867 as Liberal-Conservative member for Wellington North, Ontario.
 George Alexander Drew b. 1894   first elected in 1948 as Progressive Conservative member for Carleton, Ontario.
 Stan Dromisky b. 1931   first elected in 1993 as Liberal member for Thunder Bay—Atikokan, Ontario.
 Robert Earle Drope b. 1898   first elected in 1945 as Progressive Conservative member for Northumberland, Ontario.
 Claude Drouin b. 1956   first elected in 1997 as Liberal member for Beauce, Quebec.
 Francis Drouin b. 1983 first elected in 2015 as Liberal member for Glengarry—Prescott—Russell, Ontario.
 Noël Drouin b. 1912   first elected in 1958 as Progressive Conservative member for Dorchester, Quebec.
 Vincent Drouin b. 1932   first elected in 1962 as Liberal member for Argenteuil—Deux-Montagnes, Quebec.
 John Douglas Fraser Drummond b. 1860 first elected in 1921 as Progressive member for Middlesex West, Ontario.
 Charles Mills Drury b. 1912   first elected in 1962 as Liberal member for Saint-Antoine—Westmount, Quebec.
 Ken Dryden b. 1947   first elected in 2004 as Liberal member for York Centre, Ontario.
 John Andrew W. Drysdale b. 1926   first elected in 1958 as Progressive Conservative member for Burnaby—Richmond, British Columbia.

Du 

 Pamphile Réal Blaise Nugent Du Tremblay b. 1879   first elected in 1917 as Laurier Liberal member for Laurier—Outremont, Quebec.
 Antoine Dubé b. 1947   first elected in 1993 as Bloc Québécois member for Lévis, Quebec.
 Jean F. Dubé b. 1962   first elected in 1997 as Progressive Conservative member for Madawaska—Restigouche, New Brunswick.
 Jean-Eudes Dubé b. 1926   first elected in 1962 as Liberal member for Restigouche—Madawaska, New Brunswick.
 Matthew Dubé b. 1988 first elected in 2011 as New Democratic Party member for Beloeil—Chambly, Quebec. 
 Paul-Léon Dubé b. 1892   first elected in 1949 as Independent Liberal member for Restigouche—Madawaska, New Brunswick.
 Joseph Adélard Dubeau b. 1873 first elected in 1904 as Liberal member for Joliette, Quebec.
 Jean-Guy Dubois b. 1948   first elected in 1980 as Liberal member for Lotbinière, Quebec.
 Lucien Dubois b. 1893   first elected in 1930 as Liberal member for Nicolet, Quebec.
 V. Florent Dubois b. 1906   first elected in 1958 as Progressive Conservative member for Richmond—Wolfe, Quebec.
 Emmanuel Dubourg b. 1958 first elected in 2013 as Liberal member for Bourassa, Quebec. 
 Joseph Dubuc b. 1840 first elected in 1878 as Conservative member for Provencher, Manitoba.
 Julien-Édouard-Alfred Dubuc b. 1871 first elected in 1925 as Independent Liberal member for Chicoutimi, Quebec.
 Gilles Duceppe b. 1947 first elected in 1990 as Independent member for Laurier—Sainte-Marie, Quebec.
 Henri Jules Juchereau Duchesnay b. 1845 first elected in 1887 as Nationalist member for Dorchester, Quebec.
 Jean-Yves Duclos b. 1965 first elected in 2015 as Liberal member for Québec, Quebec.
 Louis Duclos b. 1939 first elected in 1974 as Liberal member for Montmorency, Quebec.
 William Duff b. 1872 first elected in 1917 as Laurier Liberal member for Lunenburg, Nova Scotia.
 Joseph James Duffus b. 1876   first elected in 1935 as Liberal member for Peterborough West, Ontario.
 Nicolas Dufour b. 1987 first elected in 2008 as Bloc Québécois member for Repentigny, Quebec.
 J.-Wilfrid Dufresne b. 1911   first elected in 1953 as Progressive Conservative member for Quebec West, Quebec.
 Joseph Dufresne b. 1805 first elected in 1867 as Conservative member for Montcalm, Quebec.
 Firmin Dugas b. 1830 first elected in 1871 as Conservative member for Montcalm, Quebec.
 François Octave Dugas b. 1852 first elected in 1900 as Liberal member for Montcalm, Quebec.
 Joseph Louis Euclide Dugas b. 1861 first elected in 1891 as Conservative member for Montcalm, Quebec.
 Joseph Duguay b. 1816 first elected in 1872 as Conservative member for Yamaska, Quebec.
 Joseph Léonard Duguay b. 1900   first elected in 1930 as Conservative member for Lake St. John, Quebec.
 Léo Duguay b. 1944   first elected in 1984 as Progressive Conservative member for St. Boniface, Manitoba.
 Terry Duguid first elected in 2015 as Liberal member for Winnipeg South, Manitoba. 
 Ronald J. Duhamel b. 1938   first elected in 1988 as Liberal member for St. Boniface, Manitoba.
 Cyrille Dumaine b. 1897   first elected in 1930 as Liberal member for Bagot, Quebec.
 Armand Dumas b. 1905   first elected in 1949 as Liberal member for Villeneuve, Quebec.
 Maurice Dumas b. 1927   first elected in 1993 as Bloc Québécois member for Argenteuil—Papineau, Quebec.
 Bernard Dumont b. 1928   first elected in 1962 as Social Credit member for Bellechasse, Quebec.
 Joseph Dumont b. 1847 first elected in 1878 as Liberal member for Kamouraska, Quebec.
 Eric Duncan b. 1987 first elected in 2019 as Conservative member for Stormont—Dundas—South Glengarry, Ontario.
 John Morris Duncan b. 1948   first elected in 1993 as Reform member for North Island—Powell River, British Columbia.
 Kirsty Duncan b. 1966 first elected in 2008 as Liberal member for Etobicoke North, Ontario.
 Linda Duncan b. 1949 first elected in 2008 as New Democratic member for Edmonton—Strathcona, Alberta.
 Matthew Robert Duncan b. 1863 first elected in 1921 as Conservative member for Grey North, Ontario.
 Joseph Rutherford Dundas b. 1836 first elected in 1882 as Conservative member for Victoria South, Ontario.
 Christopher Dunkin b. 1812 first elected in 1867 as Conservative member for Brome, Quebec.
 Charles Avery Dunning b. 1885   first elected in 1926 as Liberal member for Regina, Saskatchewan.
 Claude Duplain b. 1954   first elected in 2000 as Liberal member for Portneuf, Quebec.
 Suzanne Duplessis b. 1940   first elected in 1984 as Progressive Conservative member for Louis-Hébert, Quebec.
 Flavien Dupont b. 1847 first elected in 1882 as Conservative member for Bagot, Quebec.
 Raymond Dupont b. 1942   first elected in 1972 as Liberal member for Sainte-Marie, Quebec.
 Maurice Dupras b. 1923 first elected in 1970 as Liberal member for Labelle, Quebec.
 Hercule Dupré b. 1844 first elected in 1896 as Liberal member for St. Mary, Quebec.
 Maurice Dupré b. 1888 first elected in 1930 as Conservative member for Quebec West, Quebec.
 Hector Dupuis b. 1896 first elected in 1950 as Liberal member for St. Mary, Quebec.
 Vincent Dupuis b. 1889 first elected in 1929 as Liberal member for Laprairie—Napierville, Quebec.
 Yvon Dupuis b. 1926 first elected in 1958 as Liberal member for Saint-Jean—Iberville—Napierville, Quebec.
 Michel Dupuy b. 1930 first elected in 1993 as Liberal member for Laval West, Quebec.
 Gérard Duquet b. 1909 first elected in 1965 as Liberal member for Quebec East, Quebec.
 Alfred Duranleau b. 1871 first elected in 1930 as Conservative member for Chambly—Verchères, Quebec.
 Richard John Joseph Durante b. 1930 first elected in 1968 as Liberal member for Comox—Alberni, British Columbia.
 Eugène Durocher b. 1881 first elected in 1939 as Liberal member for St. James, Quebec.
 Joseph-Étienne Dussault b. 1884 first elected in 1925 as Liberal member for Lévis, Quebec.
 Pierre-Luc Dusseault b. 1991 first elected in 2011 as New Democratic Party member for Sherbrooke, Quebec.
 Scott Duvall b. 1956 first elected in 2015 as New Democratic Party member for Hamilton Mountain, Ontario.

Dy 

 Eugène Alphonse Dyer b. 1838 first elected in 1891 as Conservative member for Brome, Quebec.
 Rick Dykstra b. 1966 first elected in 2006 as Conservative member for St. Catharines, Ontario. 
 Albert Dyment b. 1869 first elected in 1896 as Liberal member for Algoma, Ontario.
 Alfred Hutchinson Dymond b. 1827 first elected in 1874 as Liberal member for York North, Ontario.

Dz
 Julie Dzerowicz b. 1979 first elected in 2015 as Liberal member for Davenport, Ontario.

D